The Women Poets International Movement (also known as Movimiento Mujeres Poetas Internacional MPI) is an international non-profit organization operated out of the Dominican Republic. It was first launched in 2009 and focuses on the promotion of female poets and poetry through collective projects, publications and events.

Events
Women Poets International is a nonprofit foundation started in November 2009 at the Dominican Republic, committed to promoting the work of contemporary female poets internationally through collective projects, and with the social responsibility of sharing messages of respect, self-esteem and nonviolence against women. This foundation holds several events throughout the year, such as the Woman Scream International Poetry Festival celebrated in march of each year, international poetry contests, and outdoor non-violence campaigns. The organization also lends assistance to various festivals, concerts, and conferences throughout the world.

Woman Scream International Poetry Festival
In 2009 the organization held their first Woman Scream International Poetry Festival (Festival Internacional de Poesía Grito de Mujer) in the Dominican Republic. The festival is held over the month of March and focuses on honoring women through multiple events. In 2011 Women Poets International expanded the focus of the event to also promote violence awareness due to the mutilation and murder of Mexican poet Susana Chávez. In 2013 the worldwide event honored Malala Yousafzai.

The event is held simultaneously in several locations around the globe such as Spain, Canada, USA, Kosovo, and other in Latin America, Asia and Europe. Typical events held include conferences, exhibitions, poetry recitals, competitions, and concerts.

Awards
 Plaque from the authorities of City of Cájar Granada, Spain 2011
 Commissioner of Miami, USA 2011
 Commissioners of Union City, New Jersey USA 2012
 Lima Clara Distinction Awards, Argentina. 2012
 Plaque in the  XV International Book Fair in Santo Domingo 2012
 Commissioners of Union City, New Jersey USA 2013

Gallery
The events created by the MPI.

See also

Woman Scream International Poetry Festival
Jael Uribe

References

External links
Official Site
Woman Scream Festival Official Site
FanPage
Woman Scream Festival FanPage
Videos
Festival Internacional de Poesía Grito de Mujer
Culture Ministry of Dominican Republic

Poetry festivals in the Dominican Republic
Poetry organizations
Organizations based in the Dominican Republic
Violence against women in the Dominican Republic
Organizations established in 2009
Women's festivals
Writers' organizations